Jacques Yandé Sarr (11 October 1934 – 18 January 2011) was the Roman Catholic bishop of the Roman Catholic Diocese of Thiès, Senegal.

Ordained to the priesthood in 1964, Sarr was appointed bishop of the Thiès Diocese in 1987 dying in  office.

Notes

Senegalese Roman Catholic bishops
1934 births
2011 deaths
Roman Catholic bishops of Thiès